The 2020 season is Malmö FF's 109th in existence, their 85th season in Allsvenskan and their 20th consecutive season in the league. They are competing in Allsvenskan, the 2019–20 Svenska Cupen where they finished as runners-up, the 2020–21 Svenska Cupen, the 2019–20 UEFA Europa League where they were knocked out in the round of 32, and the 2020–21 UEFA Europa League where they were knocked out in the play-off round. The season began with the first leg of the round of 32 of the UEFA Europa League on 20 February, league play started on 15 June and is scheduled to conclude on 6 December.

The season has been heavily affected by the COVID-19 pandemic, delaying the start of Allsvenskan from April until June, and the knock-out stage of Svenska Cupen from March and April until June and July. Malmö FF managed to play the round of 32 of the 2019–20 UEFA Europa League against VfL Wolfsburg and the group stage of the 2019–20 Svenska Cupen before the pandemic broke out. Jon Dahl Tomasson replaced Uwe Rösler as the club's head coach after the latters departure at the end of last season. Anders Christiansen was appointed new club captain after Markus Rosenberg's retirement.

Players

Squad

Players in/out

In

Out

Player statistics

Appearances and goals

Competitions

Allsvenskan

League table

Results summary

Results by round

Matches

Svenska Cupen
Kickoff times are in UTC+1 unless stated otherwise.

2019–20
The tournament continued from the 2019 season.

Group stage

Knockout stage

2020–21

Qualification stage

UEFA Europa League
Kickoff times are in UTC+1 unless stated otherwise.

2019–20
The tournament continued from the 2019 season.

Knockout phase

Round of 32

2020–21

Qualifying phase and play-off round

First qualifying round

Second qualifying round

Third qualifying round

Play-off round

Non-competitive

Pre-season
Kickoff times are in UTC+1 unless stated otherwise.

Footnotes

External links

  

Malmö FF
Malmö FF seasons
Malmo
Swedish football championship-winning seasons